Eddyville is a home rule-class city in and the county seat of Lyon County, Kentucky, United States. The population was 2,554 at the 2010 census, up from 2,350 in 2000. The Kentucky State Penitentiary is located at Eddyville. The town is considered a tourist attraction because of its access to nearby Lake Barkley.

History
Eddyville, the seat of Lyon County, was settled around 1798 and named for the eddies in the nearby Cumberland River. It became the seat of Livingston County when the county was formed in 1799; then the seat of Caldwell County upon its formation in 1809; and finally the seat of Lyon County upon its establishment in 1854. Thus, it holds the distinction of being the only city in Kentucky to have served as the county seat of three separate counties. The Eddyville post office opened in 1801.

Taking six years to build (1884–1890), the massive stone prison structure towers over Lake Barkley and is sometimes called "The Castle on the Cumberland." Its electric chair has had a long history of use, dating to the period before 1936 when executions were still publicly conducted in Kentucky for some crimes (e.g. rape as in the case of Rainey Bethea) while electrocutions at Eddyville were strictly reserved for others (e.g., murder). Executions are still held at the prison, although there have only been three since 1976 and only one since 1999. The primary method has been changed to lethal injection.

Following the completion of Kentucky Dam in the 1940s, rumors began that a dam would be built on the lower Cumberland. This meant relocating Eddyville and Kuttawa. By the mid-1950s, the construction plans were confirmed. The U.S. Army Corps of Engineers began surveying for the construction of Barkley Dam. This was met with anger from the local population.

The situation was resolved by Lee S. Jones, a native of Lyon County who had attended law school and settled in Louisville, where he had gained a reputation as one of the best "tax lawyers" and made his wealth. Jones had purchased farms in the Fairview community (which is now the site of Eddyville). He came to the Eddyville City Council and presented his plan: each person owning land in the towns (Eddyville and Kuttawa) to be flooded would receive a free lot in the new Eddyville site. This also applied to businesses.

Eddyville residents accepted his offer and on August 13, 1959, the official plat for the new town was filed with the county court clerk. The plat included 254 residential lots, 46 business lots,  for construction of a school and campus, city park, courthouse, health office, water works, and location of streets.

August 28, 1959, was designated as "Dedication and Free Deed Day" at the new site. A large group of people gathered for the event, which was held in a field, close to the site of the current post office. Mr. Jones handed the first deed to Boyce and Lillian Yates, then presented approximately 60 more residential lots. The first house to be built in the new town was the home of Mr. and Mrs. J. I. Moore. The first business to be built was the Kentucky Utilities office. During the time of building, Eddyville was "booming" and, with the impoundment of Lake Barkley in the 1960s, tourists began making their way into the area for the abundance of fish and boating. However, the tourist influx wasn't sufficient to create steady economic growth. Although campgrounds and marinas were springing up around the lake, the city was struggling.

Construction of the West Kentucky Outlet Mall was launched in December 1988. Three brothers, Bob, Darrell and Ben Jent, purchased a tract of land in the city limits of Eddyville and started construction of a mall, which opened the following fall with ten stores. Within a short time the mall would boast a total of nearly 50 stores. The opening of the mall brought a surge of progress to Eddyville, as a variety of businesses began to move into the city. For the first time in the town's history, people could choose their favorite restaurant, motel, clothing store or other places to shop—all without leaving town. It has been said the mall did more for the progress of Eddyville than any other endeavor since the establishment of the town in 1799, with the possible exception of the building of the Kentucky State Penitentiary. The town was listed as the second fastest growing area in Kentucky in 1997 based on tourism.

The mall has since suffered severe economic troubles, and few stores are currently left.

A regional water park, Venture River, operates seasonally in Eddyville.

Hundreds of homes and businesses were damaged or destroyed in Eddyville and Lyon County from a EF4 tornado that ripped through Kentucky on December 10-11, 2021.

Geography
Eddyville is located in north-central Lyon County at  (37.080671, -88.069479). It is bordered to the west by Kuttawa and to the south by Lake Barkley on the Cumberland River.

Two Interstate highways, I-24 and I-69, intersect in Eddyville. I-24 leads southeast  to Nashville, Tennessee, and west  to Paducah, while I-69 leads northeast  to Evansville, Indiana, and southwest  to the Tennessee border at Fulton. The two highways lead west together from Eddyville for  before splitting near Calvert City. U.S. Route 62 passes through the center of Eddyville, leading northeast  to Princeton and southwest  into Kuttawa. U.S. Route 641 passes through Eddyville with US 62 but splits off at the northeast border of the city and leads north  to its northern terminus in Marion.

Mineral Mound State Park occupies a peninsula in Lake Barkley in the southern part of the city. The park, golf course and peninsula extend southwest into the city limits of Kuttawa. The Kentucky State Penitentiary, also fronting on Lake Barkley, is within the southernmost extent of the Eddyville limits,  by road south of the center of town.

Demographics

As of the census of 2000, there were 2,350 people, 733 households, and 452 families residing in the city. The racial makeup of the city was 85.96% White, 12.72% African American, 0.26% Native American, 0.13% Asian, 0.30% from other races, and 0.64% from two or more races. Hispanic or Latino of any race were 0.98% of the population.

There were 733 households, out of which 24.4% had children under the age of 18 living with them, 48.8% were married couples living together, 10.9% had a female householder with no husband present, and 38.2% were non-families. 36.3% of all households were made up of individuals, and 17.5% had someone living alone who was 65 years of age or older. The average household size was 2.10 and the average family size was 2.71.

In the city the population was spread out, with 13.3% under the age of 18, 9.8% from 18 to 24, 40.5% from 25 to 44, 22.7% from 45 to 64, and 13.6% who were 65 years of age or older. The median age was 38 years. For every 100 females, there were 182.8 males. For every 100 females age 18 and over, there were 197.4 males.

The median income for a household in the city was $28,472, and the median income for a family was $44,000. Males had a median income of $37,778 versus $21,845 for females. The per capita income for the city was $14,591. About 11.9% of families and 14.0% of the population were below the poverty line, including 15.2% of those under age 18 and 16.2% of those age 65 or over.

Education
Eddyville has a lending library, the Lyon County Public Library.

Lyon County Public Schools is a public school district. It has 970 students in grades PK, K-12 with a student-teacher ratio of 18 to 1. According to state test scores, 60% of students are at least proficient in math and 65% in reading.

Notable natives and residents
 Joe Fulks, NBA player
 Chittenden Lyon, congressman
 Hylan B. Lyon, Confederate brigadier general
 Matthew Lyon, congressman
 Willis Benson Machen, Confederate congressman, U.S. senator
 John Long Routt, Governor of Colorado

References

External links

 Official website
 Local information

Cities in Lyon County, Kentucky
County seats in Kentucky
Populated places established in the 1790s
1790s establishments in Kentucky
Cities in Kentucky